17619 / 20 Aurangabad Hazur Sahib Nanded Express is an Express train belonging to Indian Railways South Central Railway zone that runs between  and  in India.

Service 
It operates as train number 17619 from Aurangabad to Hazur Sahib Nanded and as train number 17620 in the reverse direction, serving the state of Maharashtra.

Coaches

The 17619 / 20 Aurangabad–Hazur Sahib Nanded Express has one AC 3-tier, six sleeper class, six general unreserved & two SLR (seating with luggage rake) coaches. It doesn't carry a pantry car.

As with most train services in India, coach composition may be amended at the discretion of Indian Railways depending on demand.

Rake sharing

12767 / 68 – Hazur Sahib Nanded–Santragachi Express

Routeing

Traction
As this route is going to be electrified, a Guntakal-based diesel WDM-3A pulls the train to its destination.

References

External links
17619 Aurangabad Hazur Sahib Nanded Express at India Rail Info
17620 Hazur Sahib Nanded Aurangabad Express at India Rail Info

Transport in Aurangabad, Maharashtra
Transport in Nanded
Express trains in India
Rail transport in Maharashtra